Dolenje Brdo is a small settlement in the hills west of Poljane in the Municipality of Gorenja Vas–Poljane in the Upper Carniola region of Slovenia.

References

External links 

Dolenje Brdo on Geopedia

Populated places in the Municipality of Gorenja vas-Poljane